Plaza 66 is a commercial and office complex in Shanghai, consisting of a shopping mall and two skyscrapers. The shopping mall has 5 levels with a total area of over 50,000 square metres.

Tower One is currently the 7th tallest skyscraper in Shanghai and the fourth tallest building in the Puxi area. It is located at 1266 Nanjing Road West and has 66 floors. The project was developed by Hang Lung Properties of Hong Kong, led by Ronnie Chan. The buildings were designed by Kohn Pedersen Fox (KPF) architects from New York. The lead designer for KPF was James von Klemperer and the manager in charge of the project was Paul Katz. The building got third most votes in the 2001 Emporis Skyscraper Award selection.

Introduction
Plaza 66 is an office building and integrated commercial complex in Shanghai, China. The building has 66 floors, which is why it was named Plaza 66. There is a department store from the first floor to the fifth floor containing high-end brands. Many fashion brands have chosen this department store as the location for their flagship stores in Shanghai. They include Louis Vuitton, Hermes, Cartier, Chanel, Dior, Celine, Escada, Bvlgari, Fendi, Loewe, Prada, Versace and Lanvin.

The building was up until 2010 the location for M2, one of the most famous nightclubs in Shanghai. M2 was relocated to another location the same year.

Images

See also
 List of tallest buildings in Shanghai

References

External links
 
 
 
 
 
 Plaza 66 at www.hanglung.com

Hang Lung Group
Kohn Pedersen Fox buildings
Office buildings completed in 2001
Office buildings completed in 2006
Shopping malls in Shanghai
Skyscrapers in Shanghai
Twin towers
Skyscraper office buildings in Shanghai
2001 establishments in China